Celtic started the season 2005–06 looking to win the Scottish Premier League trophy and retain the Scottish Cup. They competed in the Scottish League Cup, and entered the Champions League at the qualification stage.

Celtic were knocked out of the Scottish Cup in the third round by Clyde, losing 2–1. They won the Scottish League Cup with a comfortable 3–0 victory over Dunfermline on 19 March 2006, while the league was regained after a 1–0 win over Hearts. Rival managers were quick to praise the manner in which Celtic had regained the SPL title.

Results

Scottish Premier League

UEFA Champions League

Scottish League Cup

Scottish Cup

Player statistics

Appearances and goals

List of squad players, including number of appearances by competition

|}

Goal scorers

Team statistics

League table

Technical staff

Transfers

Total spending:  £7.6 million
Total income:  £0

See also
 List of Celtic F.C. seasons

References

Celtic F.C. seasons
Celtic
Scottish football championship-winning seasons